Marcello Francesco Mastrilli (1603 – October 17, 1637) was an Italian Jesuit missionary who was martyred in Japan on Mount Unzen during the Tokugawa Shogunate, which had banned Christianity in 1614. After sailing for Japan out to find and possibly reconvert the notorious apostate Cristóvão Ferreira, who went to Japan and renounced his faith there, he was arrested as soon as he got off his ship. After three days of torture in the pit of Nagasaki, he was beheaded. A painting of his death, Martyrdom of Saint Marcello Mastrilli (1664), was made by Antonio Maria Vassallo.

Susceptible to visions, he was particularly influenced by visitations by the Jesuit missionary St. Francis Xavier, who appeared to him twice in 1633, and foretold him his martyrdom. St. Frances Xavier is credited with twice miraculously restoring Mastrilli's health (even if only to incite him to do missionary work in Japan), and since the account reportedly spread quickly through Italy, the "novena of grace," in honor of St. Francis Xavier, was established. Mastrilli's initiative is supposedly to thank for the presence of a silver casket in the Basilica of Bom Jesus in Old Goa, which houses relics of the body of St. Francis Xavier.

References

1603 births
1637 deaths
17th-century Italian Jesuits
17th-century Roman Catholic martyrs
Italian Roman Catholic missionaries
Jesuit missionaries in Japan
Italian people murdered abroad
People murdered in Japan
Italian expatriates in Japan
Italian torture victims
Deaths by decapitation